Abj is an abbreviation for abject, abjunction, and abjuration. ABJ may also refer to:

 ABJ (motorcycle), a 1950s bike built by AB Jackson Cycles of Birmingham, England
 Abaeté Linhas Aéreas, Brazil airline ICAO code
 Félix-Houphouët-Boigny International Airport, Abidjan, Côte d'Ivoire IATA code
 Aka-Bea language, ISO 639 code
 The American Business Journal, monthly business publication
 Anything But Joey, pop-rock band
 Bachelor of Arts in Journalism, degree at the University of Georgia, United States

See also
 
 
 AB (disambiguation)
 BJ (disambiguation)